The 2021 Berlin Thunder season was the first season of the new Berlin Thunder team in the inaugural season of the European League of Football.

Regular season

Standings

Schedule

Source: europeanleague.football

Roster

Notes

References 

Berlin Thunder (ELF)
Berlin Thunder
Berlin Thunder